Richmond Highway is the name of multiple highways and transit routes in Virginia:

 Richmond Highway Express, limited-stop bus route in Northern Virginia
 U.S. Route 1 in Virginia, named Richmond Highway through Richmond and Northern Virginia
 U.S. Route 301 in Virginia, concurrent with U.S. Route 1 in Richmond
 U.S. Route 60 in Virginia, named Richmond Highway through Amherst County; also named Richmond Road in Williamsburg
 Virginia State Route 110, named Richmond Highway in Arlington

See also
 Richmond Parkway (disambiguation)
 Richmond Road (disambiguation)